Coleophora agnosa is a moth of the family Coleophoridae.

References

agnosa
Moths described in 1992